I Won't may refer to:

 "I Won't", a song by Akon from his 2004 album Trouble
 "I Won't", a song by Colbie Caillat from her 2009 album Breakthrough
 "I Won't", a song by Little Mix from the 2015 album Get Weird
 "I Won't", a song by H.E.R. from her 2017 self-titled album
 "I Won't", a song by AJR